Brahim Haggiag (1934–1997), was an Algerian actor. He is most notable for the roles in the films The Battle of Algiers, Patrouille à l'Est and L'opium et le baton.

Career
In 1966, he made the acting debut with the character of 'Ali La Pointe' in the film The Battle of Algiers directed by Gillo Pontecorvo. The film became a blockbuster in that year and Haggiag was selected for the film L'opium et le baton, Les hors-la-loi and Chronicle of the Years of Fire.

Filmography

References

External links
 
 BRAHIM HAGGIAG Undefined

1966 births
Algerian actors
1997 deaths